Defending champion Diede de Groot defeated Yui Kamiji in the final, 6–4, 6–2 to win the ladies' singles wheelchair tennis title at the 2022 Wimbledon Championships. It was her seventh consecutive major singles title. Kamiji was attempting to complete the career Grand Slam.

Seeds

Draw

Finals

References

Sources
 Entry List
 Draw
 ITF Preview

Women's Wheelchair Singles
Wimbledon Championship by year – Wheelchair women's singles